The 1975–76 Liga Nacional Segunda División de Baloncesto was the second tier of the 1975–76 Spanish basketball season.

Regular season

References

External links
Hemeroteca El Mundo Deportivo

Segunda División de Baloncesto
Segunda
Second level Spanish basketball league seasons